Women's Downhill World Cup 1987/1988

Final point standings

In Women' Downhill World Cup 1986/87 the best 5 results count.

Women's Downhill Team Results

All points are shown including individual deduction. bold indicates highest score - italics indicates race wins

References
 fis-ski.com

External links
 

World Cup
FIS Alpine Ski World Cup women's downhill discipline titles